Andrew Alexander Bruce (April 15, 1866  – December 6, 1934) was an American judge who served as a justice of the Supreme Court of North Dakota from 1911 to 1918.

Early life and education
Andrew A. Bruce was born in Madras, India, on April 15, 1866, to parents of Scottish ancestry. At the time of his birth, his father Edward Archibald Bruce was a General in the British Army and was stationed in India. Bruce attended elementary school in England. In 1881, at the age of 15, Bruce was orphaned and immigrated to the United States on his own. For  several years, Bruce worked as a farm laborer in Minnesota. He then later attended the University of Wisconsin, where he received his law degree in 1892.

Career
After graduating, Bruce practiced law in Wisconsin and Illinois. He served on the legal staff of the Wisconsin Central Railway Company and the Illinois State Board of Factory Inspectors. While in Illinois and practicing as an attorney there, he lived in Chicago. In 1895, he became involved in the Ritchie v. People case and fought in favor of workers’ rights. Bruce became known as an avid advocate of labor laws, and he helped establish laws against sweat shops in Wisconsin and Illinois.

In 1898, he discontinued practicing law and began a career in teaching at the University of Wisconsin School of Law. In 1902, he moved to North Dakota and served as the Dean of the University of North Dakota School of Law until 1911.

In 1911, Governor John Burke appointed Bruce to fill the position on the North Dakota Supreme Court that had been vacated by the resignation of Justice David Morgan. Bruce entered the bench at the age of 45, and he was elected to a full term in 1912. Bruce served on the Supreme Court until resigning on December 1, 1918, including serving as chief justice from 1917-1918. His tenure as a justice lasted roughly seven years and one month. His reason for retiring was in order to reenter the teaching profession.

After resigning from the court, Bruce moved toMinnesota and taught at the University of Minnesota School of Law from 1919 to 1922. After that, he accepted a position at Northwestern University Law School where he taught until his death.

In addition to his career as an attorney, professor, and judge, Bruce wrote several books on law and was a frequent contributor to magazines, newspapers, and journals. He also served on many committees and boards, such as the President of the American Institute of Criminal Law and Criminology.

Andrew A. Bruce died on December 6, 1934, at the age of 68 after succumbing to a bronchial illness.

See also
North Dakota Supreme Court
List of justices of the North Dakota Supreme Court
List of North Dakota Supreme Court chief justices

References

Justices of the North Dakota Supreme Court
University of Wisconsin–Madison alumni
University of Wisconsin Law School alumni
1866 births
1934 deaths
Deans of law schools in the United States
North Dakota lawyers
20th-century American judges
Illinois lawyers
Wisconsin lawyers
People from Chennai
Lawyers from Chicago
Educators from Illinois
Educators from Minnesota
Educators from Wisconsin
Educators from North Dakota
University of North Dakota faculty
Northwestern University Pritzker School of Law faculty
University of Wisconsin Law School faculty
University of Minnesota Law School faculty
Chief Justices of the North Dakota Supreme Court